Degognia Township is one of 16 townships in Jackson County, in the U.S. state of Illinois.  As of the 2010 census, its population was 153 and it contained 73 housing units. The township derives its name from Degognia Creek.

Geography

Unincorporated towns
 Cora at 
 Degognia at 
 Jones Ridge at 
(This list is based on USGS data and may include former settlements.)

Adjacent townships
 Bradley Township (northeast)
 Kinkaid Township (east)
 Fountain Bluff Township (southeast)

Cemeteries
The township contains these three cemeteries: Buchanan, Houge and Isom.

Major highways
  Illinois Route 3

Airports and landing strips
 Reeds Creek Landing Airport

Rivers
 Mississippi River

Demographics

School districts
 Trico Community Unit School District 176

Political districts
 Illinois' 12th congressional district
 State House District 115
 State Senate District 58

References
 
 United States Census Bureau 2007 TIGER/Line Shapefiles
 United States National Atlas

External links
 City-Data.com
 Illinois State Archives

Townships in Jackson County, Illinois
Townships in Illinois